Pasquier is a French surname derived from Latin pascuarium (verb pascere) meaning "pasture". Pasquier shares the same root of given name and surname Pascal, from Latin Pascha, in turn from the Hebrew pesach that means literally "pass over". Alternative spellings and related names are: Pasquett, Pasquié, Pâquier, Paquier, Pasqueraud, Pasquerault, Paqueraud, Paquerault, Paquereau.

Pasquier may refer to:

Edme-Armand-Gaston d'Audiffret-Pasquier (1823–1905), French politician and member of the Académie française,
Étienne Pasquier (1529–1615), French lawyer and man of letters,
Étienne-Denis Pasquier (1767–1862), French statesman
Jérôme Pasquier (courtier), French servant and clerk of Mary, Queen of Scots
Jules Pasquier (1839-1928), French politician.
Jules-Paul Pasquier (1774-1858), French member of the Conseil d'État.
Georges Pasquier (1878-?) French road racing cyclist
Pierre Pasquier (colonial administrator) (1877-1934)
Pierre Pasquier (violist) (1902-1986), violist
Pierre Pasquier (born 1935), businessman
Bruno Pasquier born 1943, violist
Régis Pasquier born 1945, violinist
Stéphane Pasquier (born 1978), French jockey

Du Pasquier
L. Gustave du Pasquier (1876–1957), Swiss mathematician
Nathalie du Pasquier (born 1957), French painter and designer

French-language surnames